Kaikaku (改革), is the Japanese term for "radical change". In business, Kaikaku is concerned with making fundamental and radical changes to a production system, unlike Kaizen which is focused on incremental changes. Both Kaizen and Kaikaku can be applied to activities other than production.

Introduction 
Kaikaku and Kaizen are concepts in Japanese production philosophy that relate to each other.  Both have origins in the Toyota Production System.

Kaikaku means a radical change, during a limited time, of a production system.  Kaizen, on the other hand, is a system of incremental production system changes, often with the primary goal of solving team-related problems.  Kaizen is based on all employees involvement wherein singular changes generally reach an improvement of less than 20%.
A cross between Kaikaku and Kaizen is Kaizen Blitz (or Kaizen Events), which target a radical improvement in a limited area, such as a production cell, typically during an intense week.

Kaikaku means that an entire business is changed radically, typically in the form of a project. Kaikaku is most often initiated by management, since the implementation and the result will significantly impact business. Kaikaku is about introducing new knowledge, new strategies, new approaches, new production techniques or new equipment. Kaikaku can be prompted by external factors, e.g. new technology or market conditions. Kaikaku can also be initiated when management judges that diminishing improvements from ongoing Kaizen efforts suggest a need for more radical change. Kaikaku projects often result in improvements in the range of 30-50% and a new base level for continued Kaizen.  Kaikaku may also be called System Kaizen.

Kaikaku projects can be of four different types:

 Locally innovative implementation - e.g., introducing a production robot, well-known to the industry, but new to the company
 Locally innovative methodology - e.g., introducing Six Sigma or TPM methods, well-known to the industry, but new to the company
 Globally innovative implementation - e.g., introducing a new robot design to the industry
 Globally innovative methodology - e.g., introducing a new production theory to the industry

The main features of Kaikaku; 
1. It is triggered from many points such as strategic developments, business goals, customer requests…
2. Results in medium or long term, average 120 days (min: 60 days, max: 180 days),
3. Its effects are seen in the long term,
4. It consists of interrelated and complex situations,
5. Advanced analysis and statistical techniques are used,
6. It is coordinated by a core team and the team consists of experts also. (https://www.researchgate.net/publication/357310836_THREE_FACES_OF_CHANGE_IN_PROCESS_IMPROVEMENT_KAIZEN_KAIKAKU_KAKUSHIN
 Kaizen
 Pivot (Lean Startup)
 Lean Hospital

References 

Japanese business terms